Mike Abrams (born July 16, 1953) is an American psychologist and co-author with Albert Ellis of several works on rational emotive behavior therapy (REBT) and cognitive behavioral therapy (CBT). He is best known for extending CBT to include principles of evolutionary psychology and collaborating with the founder of CBT Albert Ellis to develop many new applications to for these clinical modalities. His new clinical method which applies evolutionary psychology and behavioral genetics to CBT is called Informed Cognitive Therapy (ICT).

Abrams is an Adjunct Full Professor in the M.A. Program in Psychology at New York University where he teaches graduate level courses in modern psychotherapeutic technique, Cognitive Behavioral Therapy, and the Psychology of Sexuality.  Abrams is also the managing partner of psychology for NJ, LLC a private self-funded clinical research organization. He is a contributor to About.com and is on the editorial board of Counseling and Psychotherapy Transcripts and several other journals. He actively researches the changing views and expectations of psychotherapy.

Prior to his work with Ellis and his more recent contributions to psychotherapy research, Abrams worked with people suffering from life-threatening illnesses and was the first non-gay psychologist to volunteer to counsel people with AIDS at the Gay Men's Health Crisis in New York. This work led to a book co-authored with Ellis on Death and Dying. In it, he and Ellis rejected the stage theory of Kubler-Ross and replaced it with a constructivist model of the psychology of confronting mortality.

Work With Albert Ellis

Abrams was instrumental in the formalization of Albert Ellis' model of personality. Prior to the collaboration of Albert Ellis with Mike Abrams the REBT model of personality was limited to the ABCDE model of disturbed thinking and emotions.  Their collaboration led to a more comprehensive explanation of normative and pathological personality by setting forth an iterative model of personality development. This more detailed explanation argued that the universal tendency towards irrational thinking that Ellis stated was universal. The Ellis - Abrams model proposed that people are innately and evolutionarily inclined towards rigid cognitive styles that included demandingness, absolutism, or dichotomous thinking. These irrational thinking styles were said to be exacerbated or attenuated during development by both life adversities and innate temperaments.  This and related REBT personality theories were presented in the text Abrams coauthored with Ellis which was Ellis's only college textbook Personality Theories: Critical Perspectives.

In addition, to his personality studies with Ellis, Abrams' research with Ellis into REBT and CBT led him to propose that all successful psychotherapies were actually performing CBT - irrespective of their stated theoretical orientation. Abrams argued that the equivalence of most psychotherapies found in outcome studies was a result the tendency of competent therapists to gradually progress to REBT/CBT techniques - irrespective of their claimed orientation or approach.

Work on Evolutionary Psychology
After Ellis' death, Abrams continued Ellis's work on sexuality by taking an evolutionary psychology perspective to love and intimacy. This work reached fruition in his book on sexuality titled Sexuality: Development, Differences, and Disorders. The book is only textbook on human sexuality that takes an exclusively evolutionary perspective.

Abrams wrote the book utilizing a journalistic approach interviewing many of the best known evolutionary psychologists such as David Buss, Doug Kenrick, Helen Fisher, and J. Philipe Rushton to provide multiple and often conflicting perspectives. He further extended the work of Ellis by publishing the first article, along with David Buss, to apply evolutionary psychology to CBT.

Informed Cognitive Therapy
Recently, Abrams expanded upon the synthesis of CBT and evolutionary psychology with the book The New CBT: Clinical Evolutionary Psychology. This book which set forth a new variation of CBT called informed cognitive therapy (ICT) took what was implied in much of Ellis' work and made it explicit. Abrams combined evidence from behavioral genetics and evolutionary psychology to add to the effectiveness of CBT in a clinical text proposing a new variant of CBT. Abrams argues that most psychological disorders overlie a latent factor common to virtually all pathologies. According to his model this latent factor is heritable and is supported by genome-wide studies of mental pathologies. In addition, he proposed that all psychopathologies have a heritable component that is often associated with mismatched evolutionary adaptations. Consequently, his ICT therapy requires that clinicians become familiar with behavioral genetics, evolutionary psychology, and the relationship that these sciences have with psychological problems. Abrams' premise has been supported by evolutionary psychologists like Todd Shackelford, behavioral geneticists like Robert Plomin and cognitive/memory psychologists like Elizabeth Loftus.

Published works

 Abrams, M. (2020). The New CBT: Evolutionary Clinical Psychology.  San Diego, Ca.: Cognella Press.
 Abrams, M.,  DiGiuseppe, R. & Milisavljević, M. (2020).  Preferences for psychotherapist qualities and psychotherapy modality by Gender, Culture, Age 
 and Sexual Orientation – a North American Survey. In Submission.
 Abrams, M., Milisavljević, M., & Šoškić, A. (2019). Childhood abuse: Differential gender effects on mental health and sexuality. Sexologies: European Journal of Sexology and Sexual Health / Revue européenne de sexologie et de santé sexuelle, 28(4), e89–e96.
 Abrams, M. (2018) RE/CBT for sexual disorders. In Dryden and Bernard (Eds.) REBT Best-Practice applications. London, England: Springer.
 Buss, D. M., & Abrams, M. (2017). Jealousy, infidelity, and the difficulty of diagnosing pathology: A CBT approach to coping with sexual betrayal and 
 the green-eyed monster. Journal of Rational-Emotive & Cognitive-Behavior Therapy, 35(2), 150–172.
 Abrams, M. (2016). Sexuality: Development, Differences, and Disorders. Thousand Oaks, Ca: Sage Pub.
 Abrams, M. (2014). A sexual irrational belief is associated with several measures of sexual and emotional problems and reports of life trauma. Erdélyi Pszichológiai Szemle, 15(2), 127–156.
 Abrams, M.  & Stephan, S. (2012).  Sexual abuse and masochism. Journal of Cognitive and Behavioral Psychotherapies, 12, 231-239
 Abrams, M. (2012). Helping couples deal with intimacy and sexuality. In Vernon A. (Ed.) Cognitive and Rational-Emotive Behavior Therapy with couples.  
 New York: Springer.
 Abrams-Dengelegi, L. and Abrams, M (2009). The Role of a Community Mental Health Center in a New Jersey Public School System.  Revista de Psihologie Scolara, vol 4, Dec 2009,  Asociatia Nationala a Psihologilor Scolari Eds, Romania.
 McMahon, J. & Abrams, M. (2009).  Author Motivation: An Interview Examining Personality Theory. Journal of Cognitive and Behavioral Psychotherapies, 9, 107–117.
 Ellis, A., Abrams, M., Abrams, L (2008). Theories of Personality: A critical perspective, Thousand Oaks, Ca: Sage Press
 Abrams, M. & Abrams- Dengelegi. (1997). The paradox of cognitive-behavioral and psychodynamic therapy.  The Journal of Rational-Emotive and Cognitive Behavioral Therapy, 15, 133–156.
 Abrams, M. & Ellis, A. (1996).  Rational emotive behaviour therapy in the treatment of stress.  In S. Palmer & W. Dryden (Eds.) Stress Management and Counselling: Theory Practice, Research and Methodology. London: Cassell
 Abrams, M. & Ellis, A. (1994). Rational emotive behaviour therapy in the treatment of stress. British Journal of Guidance & Counselling, 22, 39–50.
 Ellis, A. & Abrams, M. (1994). How to Cope with a Fatal Illness: The rational management of death and dying, New Jersey: Barricade Books.
 Ellis, A., Abrams, M. & Dengelegi, L. (1992). The Art and Science of Rational Eating, New Jersey: Barricade Books.
 Abrams, M. (1991). The Eating Disorder Inventory as a predictor of compliance in a behavioral weight-loss program. International Journal of Eating Disorders, 10, 355–360.
 Abrams, M. & Reber, A. (1988). Implicit learning: Robustness in the face of psychiatric disorders. Journal of Psycholinguistic Research, 17, 425–439.
 Sclafani, A. & Abrams, M. (1986). Rats show only a weak preference for the artificial sweetener aspartame. Physiology & Behavior, 37, 253–256.

References

1953 births
Living people
21st-century American psychologists
20th-century American psychologists